In biology, the BBCH-scale for grapes describes the phenological development of grapes using the BBCH-scale.

The phenological growth stages and BBCH-identification keys of grapes are:

See also
Annual growth cycle of grapevines

References
 

BBCH-scale